The 2015 Atlantic 10 Conference softball tournament will be held at Sortino Field on the campus of the University of Massachusetts in Amherst, Massachusetts from May 6 through May 9, 2015.  The tournament winner will earn the Atlantic 10 Conference's automatic bid to the 2015 NCAA Division I softball tournament. All games will be streamed online on the A-10 Network.

Tournament

All times listed are Eastern Daylight Time.

References

Atlantic 10 Tournament
Tournament, 2015
Atlantic 10 softball tournament